O'Shea  is a surname and, less often, a given name. It is an anglicized form of the Irish patronymic name Ó Séaghdha or Ó Sé, originating in the Kingdom of Corcu Duibne in County Kerry.

Notable people with the name include:

Surname 
Alicia O'Shea Petersen (1862–1923), Australian suffragist
Brian O'Shea (boxer), American boxer
Brian O'Shea (politician) (born 1944), Irish politician
Clarrie O'Shea (1906–1988), Australian labour union secretary
Conor O'Shea (b 1970) Irish Rugby player and coach
Donal O'Shea, Canadian mathematician
Franc O'Shea, Swazi musician
Greg O'Shea, Australian record producer, audio engineer, mix engineer and musician
Greg O'Shea (rugby union), Irish rugby union player
Iñaki O'Shea Basque leftist and independentist politician, jailed in early XXIth century. 
Jack O'Shea (born 1957), All-Ireland winning Gaelic footballer from County Kerry
James O'Shea and John O'Shea, Victorian stone carvers associated with John Ruskin
Jay O'Shea (born 1988), Irish footballer
John O'Shea (born 1981), Irish international footballer who has won the Premier League, the FA Cup and the UEFA Champions League
John O'Shea (director) (1920–2001), New Zealand film director
John O'Shea (humanitarian) (born 1944), Irish founder of GOAL, international humanitarian organization based in Ireland
John Augustus O'Shea (1839–1905), Irish soldier, journalist, and writer
Katharine O'Shea (1846–1921), English wife of Irish politician, Charles Stewart Parnell
Kel O'Shea (born 1933), Australian rugby league footballer
Kevin O'Shea  (1925–2003) was an All-American college basketball player who later played professionally
Lucius Trant O'Shea (1858-1920), British chemist and mining engineer
Mark O'Shea (herpetologist) (born 1956), English herpetologist
Mark O'Shea (musician) (born 16 February 1977), Australian singer-songwriter
Michael O'Shea (1906–1973), American actor
Mike O'Shea (Canadian football) (born 1970), Canadian football player
Milo O'Shea (1926–2013), Irish actor
Natalia O'Shea (born 1976), Russian linguist and musician
Rick O'Shea (born 1973), Irish radio DJ
Steve O'Shea, New Zealand marine biologist and environmentalist
Tessie O'Shea (1913–1995), Welsh entertainer and actress
Timothy O'Shea (born 1949), vice-chancellor and principal of the University of Edinburgh
Tony O'Shea (born 1961), English darts player
William O'Shea (1840–1905), Irish soldier and Member of Parliament

Given name 
Oshae Brissett (born 1998), Canadian basketball player
Ice Cube (born O'Shea Jackson in 1969) American rapper and actor
O'Shea Jackson Jr. (born 1991), his son, rapper and actor

See also
O'Shea, an American-based Australian country music duo
O'Shea and Whelan, an Irish family practice of stonemasons and sculptors
Jack O'Shea's, meat retailer in Brussels and London
Shea (disambiguation)
 Ó Sé – Irish language spelling of this name

Surnames
Anglicised Irish-language surnames
English-language surnames